Sakkyryr Airport  is an airport serving the urban locality of Batagay-Alyta, Eveno-Bytantaysky National District, in the Sakha Republic of Russia, along the Yana River.

Airlines and destinations

References

  

Airports built in the Soviet Union
Airports in the Arctic
Airports in the Sakha Republic